The 1906 Princeton Tigers football team represented Princeton University in the 1906 college football season. In their first season under head coach Bill Roper, the team compiled a 9–0–1 record, shut out eight of ten opponents, and outscored all opponents by a total of 205 to 9. Herb Dillon was the team captain.

There was no contemporaneous system in 1906 for determining a national champion. However, Princeton was retroactively named as the national champion by the Helms Athletic Foundation and National Championship Foundation. 

Three Princeton players were selected as consensus first-team players on the 1906 All-America team: quarterback Edward Dillon; end Caspar Wister; and tackle James Cooney. Other key players included fullback Jim McCormick, who was later inducted into the College Football Hall of Fame.

Schedule

References

Princeton
Princeton Tigers football seasons
College football national champions
College football undefeated seasons
Princeton Tigers football